Grewioideae is a subfamily of the family Malvaceae and was first described by Hochreutiner. The group is named after its type genus, Grewia, which is named for the English scientist Nehemiah Grew (1641-1712).  It contains a number of genera that were previously placed in the defunct family Tiliaceae.

Description
Within the Malvaceae, this subfamily has its inflorescences opposite the leaves, the corollas are usually clawed, and there is a nectar-bearing hair carpet at the base of the petals and there are numerous dithecal stamens. The fruit is fleshy or capsular with spines, and the seeds are winged.  The group is thought to have originated about 42  (± 15) million years ago.

Taxonomy
Ulrike Brunken & Alexandra Muellner  divide the Grewioideae into two clades, the Grewia clade, Grewieae Endl. and the Apeiba clade, Apeibeae Benth., on the basis of morphological and molecular evidence.

Tribes and genera
The subfamily includes the following genera - accepted by Bayer & Kubitzki (2003)
 Apeibeae Benth.
 Ancistrocarpus 
 Apeiba 
 Clappertonia 
 Corchorus 
 Entelea 
 Erinocarpus 
 Glyphaea 
 Heliocarpus 
 Pseudocorchorus 
 Sparrmannia 
 Triumfetta 
 Grewieae Endl.
 Colona 
 Desplatsia 
 Duboscia 
 Eleutherostylis 
 Goethalsia 
 Grewia 
 Hydrogaster 
 Luehea 
 Lueheopsis 
 Microcos 
 Mollia 
 Tetralix 
 Trichospermum 
 Vasivaea

References

External links
 
 
 Hochreutiner, B.P.G. 1914. Notes sur les Tiliacées avec descriptions d’espèces, de sections et de sous-familles nouvelles ou peu connues. Annuaire du Conservatoire et du Jardin botanique de Genève 18: 68–128.

 
Rosid subfamilies